Rabbi of the Western Wall and the Holy Places (in short: Rabbi of the Western Wall) operates under the Chief Rabbinate of Israel, and is responsible for providing religious services to Jews at the Western Wall and other holy places in Israel, listed in the Regulations for the Preservation of Holy Places for Jews, 1981.

As part of his role, the Rabbi of the Western Wall is in charge of enforcing the Law on the Preservation of the Holy Places, 1967 in places under his supervision, including the prevention of Sabbath desecration, prevention of inappropriate attire, prevention of Begging and interruption of prayer in the Western Wall plaza, restrictions on the practice of photography at the Western Wall plaza etc. The Rabbi of the Western Wall participates in ceremonies that take place in the Western Wall plaza, and is often accompanied by public figures from the around the world who visit the Western Wall for the first time.

Since 1967, four rabbis have served in this position, with the appointment being a lifetime tenure. Since 2000, Rabbi Shmuel Rabinovitch has been in the position.

References

Jewish holy places
Western Wall
Rabbis in Jerusalem